You Already Know is the debut solo studio album by American Brooklyn-based rapper and record producer "The Don Bishop" Agallah  8-Off the Assassin. It was released on August 8, 2006 through Babygrande Records. Recording sessions took place at the Work Room in New York. Production was handled primarily by Agallah himself, along with The Alchemist, Big Zik, DJ Premier, Grimy Kid and Sid Roams, with Shiest Bubz serving as executive producer. It features guest appearances from Ike Eyes, Big V, Carl Anthony, Clutch, Dead Prez, Kool G Rap, The Alchemist, Umi and Prodigy. The album was supported by the two singles: "Club Hoppin'" and "New York Ryder Music".

Track listing

References

External links

Agallah albums
2006 debut albums
Babygrande Records albums
Albums produced by Agallah
Albums produced by DJ Premier
Albums produced by the Alchemist (musician)